Sam Walker (born 16 June 2002) is a professional rugby league footballer who plays as a  &  for the Sydney Roosters in the NRL.

He has played for the Prime Minister's XIII at representative level.

Background
Walker was born in Leeds, West Yorkshire, England, while his Australian father Ben, a professional rugby league player, was playing for the Leeds Rhinos in the Super League. Walker and his family moved back to Australia in 2003 and settled in Ipswich, Queensland, where he was raised.

He played his junior rugby league for the North Ipswich Tigers and attended Ipswich Grammar School before being signed by the Brisbane Broncos.

Walker's uncles Shane and Chris are also former professional rugby league players.

Playing career
In 2019, Walker played for the Ipswich Jets in the Mal Meninga Cup. On 5 June 2019, he started at halfback for Queensland under-18 in their 34–12 win over New South Wales. On 11 June 2019, he signed with the Sydney Roosters on a two-year deal.

On 29 September 2019, Walker represented the Australian Schoolboys, scoring a try in their 36–20 win over the Junior Kiwis.

In 2020, Walker joined the Roosters' NRL squad but did not play a single game that year due to the COVID-19 pandemic and the cancellation of the NSW Cup and Jersey Flegg Cup competitions. In round 15 of the 2020 NRL season, he was included in the Roosters 21-man squad to play the Wests Tigers but was omitted from the side before the game.

2021
On 27 February, Walker played in the Sydney Roosters’ pre-season trial win over the Canberra Raiders, scoring a try. He began the 2021 season playing for North Sydney, the Roosters' NSW Cup feeder team.

In round 4 of the 2021 NRL season, Walker made his first-grade debut for the Sydney Roosters against the New Zealand Warriors at the Sydney Cricket Ground, assisting a try and scoring a conversion as his side won 32–12. The following week, he scored his first try in the NRL and set up three others in a pivotal performance as the Roosters went from being 4–18 down to the Cronulla-Sutherland Sharks, to mounting a comeback to win 26–18.

In round 14, Walker kicked the winning field goal as the Sydney Roosters defeated the Gold Coast Titans 35–34.

In round 17, with just under 20 seconds left to play, Walker bizarrely ran 90 metres in the opposite direction before running over the sideline as the Sydney Roosters defeated Canterbury-Bankstown 22-16.

In week 1 of the finals, against the Gold Coast Titans, Walker kicked the winning field goal in the 77th minute of the game, as the Roosters went on to win the match 25-24.
On 27 September, Walker was named Dally M Rookie of the year.

2022
In round 18 of the 2022 NRL season, Walker scored one try and kicked nine goals in the Sydney Roosters 54-26 victory over St. George Illawarra.
In round 23, Walker kicked twelve goals from twelve attempts in the clubs 72-6 victory over the Wests Tigers.
Walker played a total of 25 games for the club in the 2022 season and finished as their top point scorer with 211 points. Walker played for the Sydney Roosters in their elimination final loss to South Sydney.
On 7 December 2022, Walker signed a two-year contract extension to remain at the Sydney Roosters until the end of the 2025 season.

References

External links

Sydney Roosters profile

2002 births
Living people
Australian rugby league players
North Sydney Bears NSW Cup players
Rugby league halfbacks
Rugby league players from Leeds
Sydney Roosters players
Sam